Jehangira Tehsil is a tehsil located in Nowshera District, Khyber-Pakhtunkhwa, Pakistan. The tehsil is named after the Jehangira town, which is located on the GT Road.A village, Hasan Darra, also exists in Tehsil Jehangira!

Overview 

Jehangira tehsil covers the jurisdiction from Akora Khattak to Khairabad. The head quarter and capital of Jehangira tehsil is Jehangira town. The famous land marks in Jehangira tehsil are Darul Uloom Haqqania at Akora Khattak, tomb of Khushal Khan Khattak, a library and a small museum in the name of Khushal Khan Khattak and shrine of Akhund Adyan Baba Seljoki.

The population of Jehangira tehsil, according to the 2017 census, is 353,490 while according to the 1998 census, the population of the area covering Jehangira tehsil, was 208,704.

Towns and Villages 
The main towns of Jehangira Tehsil are Jehangira, Akora Khattak, Khairabad, Nizampur. The main villages in Jehangira tehsil are below.

 Khawrai
 Adamzai
 Misri Banda
 Nandrak
 Mian Essa
 Wattar
 Surya Khel
 Mali Khel Bala
 Masam Khel
 Narri Naodeh
 Nihal Pura
 Uftada Hangal
 Banda Hangal
 Mushak
 Namal Sara Toi
 Chishmai
 Hardomizri Tang
 Kund
 Katti Miana
 Shaidu
 Lashora Totki
 Garu
 Jabbi
 Khar Mela
 Aman Pura
 Kahi
 Mami Khel
 Shagai
 Kawa

Education 
Jahangira teshil is home to many excellent educational institutes. The prominent are Govt Khushal Khan Khattak Degree College Akora Khattak and Govt Maulana Abdul Haq Degree College Khan Kohi, Nizampur.

See also 
 Nowshera Tehsil
 Pabbi Tehsil
 Nowshera District

References 

Populated places in Nowshera District
Tehsils of Khyber Pakhtunkhwa